Alexis Renard (born 1 June 1999) is a French cyclist, who currently rides for UCI WorldTeam . In October 2020, he was named in the startlist for the 2020 Vuelta a España.

Major results
2016
 1st Stage 3 Ronde des Vallées
2017
 1st Grand Prix Bob Jungels
 2nd Overall Grand Prix Rüebliland
1st Stage 1
 3rd Road race, National Junior Road Championships
 5th Overall Tour du Valromey
1st Stage 1
 7th Overall Ronde des Vallées
1st Stage 2 (ITT)
2021
 2nd Münsterland Giro
 3rd Overall Tour de Wallonie
2022
 7th Overall Circuit de la Sarthe
 10th Overall Saudi Tour

Grand Tour general classification results timeline

References

External links

1999 births
Living people
French male cyclists
Sportspeople from Chambéry
Cyclists from Auvergne-Rhône-Alpes